In 1992, Curb Records released a compilation of Shaun Cassidy's five studio albums.  However, no songs were included from Cassidy's 1979 live album, That's Rock 'N' Roll Live.

Track listing
"Da Doo Ron Ron" (Phil Spector, Jeff Barry, Ellie Greenwich)  2:48   
"That's Rock 'n' Roll" (Eric Carmen)   2:53   
"Teen Dream" (Shaun Cassidy)  2:33   
"Do You Believe in Magic" (John Sebastian)   2:16   
"Hey Deanie" (Eric Carmen)   3:37   
"It's Like Heaven" (Ruston Pamphlin, Brian Wilson, Diane Rovell)   3:05   
"Hard Love" (Shaun Cassidy)   3:40   
"She's Right" (Shaun Cassidy)   3:33   
"Break for the Street" (Shaun Cassidy)   4:25   
"So Sad About Us" (Pete Townshend)   3:03   
"Cool Fire" (Todd Rundgren, Shaun Cassidy, Roger Powell, John Wilcox)   4:15   
"Once Bitten, Twice Shy" (Ian Hunter)   4:08

Shaun Cassidy albums
1992 greatest hits albums
Albums produced by Todd Rundgren
Curb Records compilation albums